Haider Rameez (born 13 November 1988) is a Pakistani cricketer. He made his List A debut for Habib Bank Limited in the 2018–19 Quaid-e-Azam One Day Cup on 24 October 2018.

References

External links
 

1988 births
Living people
Pakistani cricketers
Habib Bank Limited cricketers
Place of birth missing (living people)